ǁkabbo pronounced  (d.  25 January 1876) (also known as ǀuhi-ddoro or Jantje) was a noted |xam (San) chronicler of ǀxam culture and knowledge. He played an important role in contributing to the Bleek and Lloyd archive of “Specimens of Bushman Folklore” providing the life, rituals, and beliefs of ǀxam society.

Works

References

External links
Bleek and Lloyd Archive online
 authors: ||kabbo (Jantje) (II)

San people
19th-century South African people
South African folklore
1876 deaths